The 2022 Viterra Saskatchewan Scotties Tournament of Hearts, the provincial women's curling championship for Saskatchewan, was held from January 5 to 9 at the Assiniboia Curling Club in Assiniboia, Saskatchewan. The winning Penny Barker team represented Saskatchewan at the 2022 Scotties Tournament of Hearts in Thunder Bay, Ontario.

Qualification process

Teams
The teams are listed as follows:

Knockout brackets

Source:

A event

B event

C event

Knockout results
All draw times listed in Central Time (UTC−06:00).

Draw 1
Wednesday, January 5, 7:30 pm

Draw 2
Thursday, January 6, 9:00 am

Draw 3
Thursday, January 6, 3:00 pm

Draw 4
Thursday, January 6, 7:30 pm

Draw 5
Friday, January 7, 10:00 am

Draw 6
Friday, January 7, 3:00 pm

Draw 7
Friday, January 7, 7:30 pm

Draw 8
Saturday, January 8, 10:00 am

Draw 9
Saturday, January 8, 3:00 pm

Playoffs

A vs. B
Saturday, January 8, 7:30 pm

C1 vs. C2
Saturday, January 8, 7:30 pm

Semifinal
Sunday, January 9, 10:00 am

Final
Sunday, January 9, 3:00 pm

References

2022 in Saskatchewan
Curling in Saskatchewan
2022 Scotties Tournament of Hearts
January 2022 sports events in Canada